Usha Martin School, Malda is a secondary school in Old Malda, Malda district, West Bengal, India.

See also
Education in India
List of schools in India
Education in West Bengal

References

External links

High schools and secondary schools in West Bengal
Schools in Malda district
Educational institutions in India with year of establishment missing